The Tanafjord or Tanafjorden is a large fjord in Troms og Finnmark county, Norway. It is located in the municipalities of Tana, Gamvik, and Berlevåg. The fjord separates the Nordkinn Peninsula (Gamvik Municipality) in the west from the Varanger Peninsula (Berlevåg Municipality) in the east.

The Tana River empties into the southern part of the fjord. There are several side fjords which branch off of the main Tanafjorden including the Hopsfjorden, Langfjorden, and Gulgofjorden. There are some settlements along the fjord, but they are all small and rather isolated. Settlements include the villages of Vestertana, Austertana, Trollfjorden, Skjånes, Nervei, and Store Molvik. Norwegian County Road 98 and Norwegian County Road 890 run along the southern parts of the fjord.

See also
 List of Norwegian fjords

References

Fjords of Troms og Finnmark
Tana, Norway
Gamvik
Berlevåg